María Luisa Bonet Carbonell is a Spanish computer scientist interested in logic in computer science, including proof complexity and algorithms for the maximum satisfiability problem. She is a professor of computer science at the Polytechnic University of Catalonia.

Education and career
Bonet is originally from Barcelona. After earning a degree in philosophy at the University of Barcelona in 1984, she became a Fulbright Fellow at the University of California, Berkeley. She earned a master's degree in mathematics there in 1987, and became a doctoral student of Samuel Buss, studying theoretical computer science. Buss moved to the University of California, San Diego in 1988, but Bonet remained at Berkeley; her 1991 doctoral dissertation, The Lengths of Propositional Proofs and the Deduction Rule, listed both Buss and Leo Harrington as co-advisors.

Bonet did postdoctoral research as a Warchawski Assistant Professor at the University of California, San Diego, at the University of Pennsylvania, and at DIMACS in New Jersey. She returned to Barcelona in 1996, to take a position in the computer science department of the Polytechnic University of Catalonia. She became a full professor there in 2007.

Selected publications
; preliminary version in 27th Symposium on Theory of Computing (STOC 1995), 

; based on conference papers in SAT 2009, CCIA 2009, AAAI 2010, and CP 2012

References

External links
Home page

Year of birth missing (living people)
Living people
Spanish computer scientists
Spanish women computer scientists
University of Barcelona alumni
Fulbright alumni
University of California, Berkeley alumni
Academic staff of the Polytechnic University of Catalonia